Armageddon is a 1998 American science fiction disaster film produced and directed by Michael Bay, produced by Jerry Bruckheimer, and released by Touchstone Pictures. The film follows a group of blue-collar deep-core drillers sent by NASA to stop a gigantic asteroid on a collision course with Earth. It stars Bruce Willis with Billy Bob Thornton, Liv Tyler, Ben Affleck, Will Patton, Keith David, Michael Clarke Duncan, Peter Stormare, and Steve Buscemi.

The film was a commercial success, grossing $553 million worldwide against a $140 million budget and becoming the highest-grossing film of 1998. However, the film received mixed reviews from critics.

Plot
A massive meteor shower destroys the orbiting Space Shuttle Atlantis, before entering the atmosphere and bombarding New York City. The meteors were pushed out of the asteroid belt by a rogue comet that also jarred loose a Texas-sized asteroid that will impact Earth in 18 days, causing an event that will wipe out all life on the planet. NASA devises a plan to have a deep core oil driller team to be trained into astronauts and drill a hole into the asteroid, into which they will insert and detonate a nuclear bomb to destroy the asteroid.

They recruit Harry Stamper, a third-generation oil driller and owner of his own oil drilling company. Harry agrees to help, but on the condition that he bring in his own team to do the drilling. He picks his best employees for the job: Chick Chapel, his best friend and right-hand man; geologists Rockhound and Oscar Choice; and drillers Bear Curlene, Freddie Noonan, Max Lennert, and A.J. Frost (who has been dating Harry's daughter Grace despite Harry's objections). Over twelve days, they train with astronaut Willie Sharp, who will pilot Freedom — one of the two shuttles to fly to the asteroid, the other being the Independence. Before leaving, Chick apologizes to his ex-wife for wronging her and sees his son, who is unaware of his parentage. Grace accepts A.J.'s marriage proposal, much to Harry's reluctant dismay; she later has her father promise to return home safe with her fiancé.

Following the destruction of Shanghai by another meteor strike, word of the massive asteroid becomes public to the world. Both shuttles take off without incident and dock with the Russian Space Station Mir to take on fuel. During fueling, a spark causes a fire. A.J. and Russian Cosmonaut Lev Andropov manage to board Independence before the space station is destroyed.

Approaching the asteroid, Independence is damaged by debris and crashes, killing all on board except Lev, Bear, and A.J. They embark in the shuttle's Armadillo to find the Freedom crew, which lands 26 miles from its intended landing site. When the drilling goes slower than predicted, Sharp reports to Mission Control that it is unlikely that the team will reach the depth necessary to destroy the asteroid before "Zero Barrier", the point after which detonating the rock will not save Earth. Even though it might cause total mission failure, the President of the United States decides to remote detonate the bomb from Earth. Sharp and Harry have a vicious argument, but agree to defuse the bomb and work together after Harry promises Sharp that he will accomplish the mission. They make progress on drilling, but a missed gas pocket causes a blowout that destroys the Armadillo and kills Max. Just as Harry, NASA, and the world believe the mission to be a failure, A.J. and the others arrive in the second Armadillo, but not before another meteor devastates Paris.

A.J. succeeds in drilling the hole to the required depth, but a rock storm kills Gruber and damages the remote detonator, forcing someone to stay behind and manually detonate the bomb. They draw straws; the responsibility falls upon A.J. Harry takes him down to the asteroid's surface, and disconnects A.J.'s air hose, forcing him into the shuttle's air lock. He tells A.J. that he is the son he never had and that he would be proud to have him marry Grace. Using the Armadillo, Harry tearfully gives Grace his blessing to marry A.J., and Grace says that she is proud to be his daughter.

After some difficulty, Freedom takes off, but a second blowout causes Harry to lose his grip on the detonator. Just before Zero Barrier, he detonates the bomb and saves the planet. The astronauts land on Earth safely. A.J. and Grace are reunited and Chick reconciles with his ex-wife and estranged son. Later, A.J. and Grace are married with the portraits of Harry and the others lost on the mission present in memoriam.

Cast

Production

According to Bruce Joel Rubin, writer of Deep Impact, a production president at Disney took notes on everything the writer said during lunch about his script and initiated Armageddon as a counter film at Disney. Nine writers worked on the script, five of whom are credited. In addition to Robert Roy Pool, Jonathan Hensleigh, Tony Gilroy, Shane Salerno and J. J. Abrams, the writers involved included Paul Attanasio, Ann Biderman, Scott Rosenberg and Robert Towne. Originally, it was Hensleigh's script, based on Pool's original, that had been given the green-light by Touchstone. Then-producer, Jerry Bruckheimer, hired the succession of scribes for rewrites and polishes. Astronomers would subsequently note that Deep Impact was more scientifically accurate.

Bruce Willis was cast in the film as part of a three-picture deal he cut with the studio to compensate them for the dissolution of 1997's Broadway Brawler. He received a significant pay cut for the picture as part of the deal.

In May 1998, Walt Disney Studios chairman Joe Roth expanded the film's budget by $3 million to include additional special effects scenes by Dream Quest Images showing an asteroid impacting Paris. This additional footage, incorporated two months prior to the film's release, was specifically added for the television advertising campaign to visually differentiate the film from Deep Impact which was released a few months before.

Music

Release

Marketing
Prior to Armageddons release, the film was advertised in Super Bowl XXXII at a cost of $2.6 million.

Home media
Despite a mixed critical reception, a DVD edition of Armageddon was released by The Criterion Collection, a specialist film distributor of primarily arthouse films that markets what it considers to be "important classic and contemporary films" and "cinema at its finest". In an essay supporting the selection of Armageddon, film scholar Jeanine Basinger, who taught Michael Bay at Wesleyan University, states that the film is "a work of art by a cutting-edge artist who is a master of movement, light, color, and shape—and also of chaos, razzle-dazzle, and explosion". She sees it as a celebration of working men: "This film makes these ordinary men noble, lifting their efforts up into an epic event." Further, she states that in the first few moments of the film all the main characters are well established, saying, "If that isn't screenwriting, I don't know what is".

The film was also released on VHS and DVD by Touchstone Home Video on November 13, 1998, and would surpass Pretty Woman to become Buena Vista Home Entertainment's best-selling live-action title. Armageddon then premiered on both VHS and DVD formats on February 1, 1999, in the UK. It was the country's best-selling DVD release, selling over 100,000 copies. However, this record would be surpassed by The Matrix later that year. The film was released on a standard edition Blu-ray in 2010 with only a few special features.

Television airing
By April 2002, ABC airings of Armageddon had already received modifications due to the September 11 attacks that occurred a year prior. The scene where the World Trade Center was hit by meteors and caught on fire was edited out because of its similarity to the attacks.

Following the 2003 Columbia disaster, some screen captures from the opening scene where Atlantis is destroyed were passed off as satellite images of the disaster in a hoax. Additionally, the American cable network FX, which had intended to broadcast Armageddon that evening, removed the film from its schedule and aired Aliens in its place.

Reception

Box office
It was the highest-grossing film of 1998 worldwide and the second-highest-grossing film of that year in the United States, finishing just behind Saving Private Ryan.

Critical response
Armageddon received mostly mixed reviews from film critics, many of whom took issue with "the furious pace of its editing". On the review aggregator website Rotten Tomatoes, the film has a 38% "Rotten" approval rating based on 125 reviews, with an average rating of 5.2/10. The critical consensus states, "Lovely to look at but about as intelligent as the asteroid that serves as the movie's antagonist, Armageddon slickly sums up the cinematic legacies of producer Jerry Bruckheimer and director Michael Bay." Metacritic gave the film a weighted average score of 42 out of 100, based on 23 critics, indicating "mixed or average reviews". Audiences polled by CinemaScore gave the film an average grade of "A−" on an A+ to F scale.

The film is on the list of Roger Ebert's most hated films. In his original review, Ebert stated, "The movie is an assault on the eyes, the ears, the brain, common sense and the human desire to be entertained". On Siskel and Ebert, Ebert gave it a Thumbs Down. However, his co-host Gene Siskel gave it a Thumbs Up, commenting on the noise and intensity of the film, but also stating that he found the film to be amusing. Ebert went on to name Armageddon as the worst film of 1998 (though he was originally considering Spice World). Todd McCarthy of Variety also gave the film a negative review, noting Michael Bay's rapid cutting style: "Much of the confusion, as well as the lack of dramatic rhythm or character development, results directly from Bay's cutting style, which resembles a machine gun stuck in the firing position for 2 hours."
In April 2013, in a Miami Herald interview to promote Pain & Gain, Bay was quoted as having said:…We had to do the whole movie in 16 weeks. It was a massive undertaking. That was not fair to the movie. I would redo the entire third act if I could. But the studio literally took the movie away from us. It was terrible. My visual effects supervisor had a nervous breakdown, so I had to be in charge of that. I called James Cameron and asked "What do you do when you're doing all the effects yourself?" But the movie did fine.Some time after the article was published, Bay changed his stance, claiming that his apology only related to the editing of the film, not the whole film, and accused the writer of the article for taking his words out of context. The author of the article, Miami Herald writer Rene Rodriguez, claimed: "NBC asked me for a response, and I played them the tape. I didn't misquote anyone. All the sites that picked up the story did."

Scientific accuracy

In an interview with Entertainment Weekly, Bay admitted that the film's central premise "that NASA could actually do something in a situation like this" was unrealistic. Additionally, the largest known potentially hazardous asteroid (PHA) is (53319) 1999 JM8, which is only  in diameter, while the asteroid in the movie is described as being "the size of Texas". Near the end of the credits, there is a disclaimer stating, "The National Aeronautics and Space Administration's cooperation and assistance does not reflect an endorsement of the contents of the film or the treatment of the characters depicted therein."

The infeasibility of the H-bomb approach was published by four undergraduate physics students in 2011 and then reported by The Daily Telegraph in 2012:

In the commentary track, Ben Affleck says he "asked Michael why it was easier to train oil drillers to become astronauts than it was to train astronauts to become oil drillers, and he told me to shut the fuck up, so that was the end of that talk."

Accolades

Other media

Merchandising
Revell and Monogram released two model kits inspired by the film's spacecraft and the Armadillos, in 1998. The first one, "Space Shuttle with Armadillo drilling unit", included an X-71, a small, rough Armadillo and a pedestal. The second one, "Russian Space Center", included the Mir, with the docking adapter seen in the film, and another pedestal.

In 2011, Fantastic Plastic released another X-71 kit, the "X-71 Super Shuttle", the goal of which was to be more accurate than the Revell/Monogram kit.

Theme park attraction
Armageddon – Les Effets Speciaux was an attraction based on Armageddon at Walt Disney Studios Park located at Disneyland Paris. The attraction simulated the scene in the movie in which the Russian Space Station is destroyed. Michael Clarke Duncan ("Bear" in the film) was featured in the pre-show.

See also

 Asteroid deflection strategies
 List of disaster films
 List of films featuring space stations

Explanatory notes

References

Bibliography

External links

 
 
 
 
 
 
 
 
 Armageddon an essay by Jeanine Basinger at the Criterion Collection

1998 films
1990s disaster films
1998 science fiction films
1990s science fiction action films
American disaster films
American science fiction films
American science fiction action films
American space adventure films
Fiction about near-Earth asteroids
1990s English-language films
Films about astronauts
Films about nuclear war and weapons
Films set in Florida
Films set in Houston
Films set in Istanbul
Films set in New York City
Films set in Paris
Films set in Shanghai
Films set in the White House
Films set in Uttar Pradesh
Films directed by Michael Bay
Films produced by Jerry Bruckheimer
Films produced by Michael Bay
Films produced by Gale Anne Hurd
Films scored by Trevor Rabin
Films with screenplays by J. J. Abrams
Films with screenplays by Tony Gilroy
Films about NASA
Films about space hazards
Golden Raspberry Award winning films
Films about impact events
Touchstone Pictures films
Films with screenplays by Robert Roy Pool
1990s American films